Club Deportivo Palestino is a professional football club based in the city of Santiago, Chile. The club was founded in 1920 and plays in the Primera División de Chile. They play their home games at the Estadio Municipal de La Cisterna stadium, which has a capacity of approximately 8,000 seats.

History
The club was founded on 20 August 1920, when they participated in a colonial competition in Osorno. It was founded by a group of Palestinians; the name of the club reflects the origin in Chile's Palestinian community.

According to American historian Brenda Elsey, "Leaders of the Arab immigrant community who hoped to find a niche within popular culture for their organizations decided to participate in football once again in 1940s".

Beginnings in professional football
In 1952 the Football Federation of Chile set up the first professional leagues. Palestino was accepted into the Second Division, which they won to attain promotion to the Primera División.

1955 title
In 1955 the club won their first national championship under the coaching of Argentine captain Roberto Coll, in that era the club became known by the nickname millonario (Millionaire) because of their ability to attract top class footballers.

1978−present
In 1978 the club won their second league title, this time the team was led by Chilean captain Elías Figueroa. In this campaign they set a new record in the domestic tournament, for the number of games unbeaten and soon won the Copa Chile to claim the league and cup double.

In 2004 the club became a registered company, but the change of status did not bring the expected improvement in results. In 2006 they finished in 18th place out of 20 teams, forcing them to face a play-off against Fernandez Vial to keep their place in the top flight. Ultimately the club would triumph thus preserving their spot within the Chilean first division.

The club made a surprising run to the final of the Clausura 2008 tournament, where they lost to champions Colo-Colo. Following this success, the club intends to float on the Chilean and Palestinian stock exchanges.

In January 2014, Palestino was fined the equivalent of $1,300 for using a new team jersey in the club's traditional colors, red, green and black, but with the number one in the squad numbers on the back shaped as the map of Palestine prior to the creation of Israel in 1948.  Chilean Jewish groups complained about the political significance of this, with a formal complaint to their national Federation being made by Patrick Kiblisky, owner of first-division club Ñublense. The jerseys were said to have been first used in December 2013, although the club said they were used in the prior season. The federation banned the club from using the map on the back of the shirts and imposed a fine on the club on the grounds that the Federation is opposed to "any form of political, religious, sexual, ethnic, social or racial discrimination". On its Facebook page, the club stated: "For us, free Palestine will always be historical Palestine, nothing less."

Honours
Primera División
 Champions (2): 1955, 1978
 Runners-up (4): 1953, 1974, 1986, 2008 Clausura

Copa Chile
 Champions (3): 1975, 1977, 2018

Primera B
 Champions (2): 1952, 1972

Players

Current squad

2023 Summer Transfers

In

Out

Sponsors 
Companies that Club Deportivo Palestino currently has sponshorship deals with include:

 Alegrebet

Former coaches

 Luis Tirado (1952)
 Antonio Ciraolo (1953)
 Boris Stefanović (1955–57)
 Antonio de Mare (1958–59)
 Alejandro Scopelli (1960)
 Hugo Tassara (1961–62)
 José Della Torre (1963)
 Ladislao Pakozdy (1963)
 Miguel Mocciola (1964)
 José Valdebenito (1964)
 Zezé Moreira (1964)
 Enrique Fernández (1965)
 Alejandro Scopelli (1966)
 Oscar Andrade (1967)
 Julio Baldovinos (1967)
 Adolfo Rodríguez (1968–69)
 J. Lecea (1969)
 Isaac Carrasco (1970)
 Héctor Ortega (1970)
 Dante Pesce (1971)
 Alejandro Scopelli (1971)
 Adolfo Rodríguez (1972)
 Humberto Diaz (1972)
 Nestor Isella (1973)
 Humberto Diaz (1973)
 Caupolicán Peña (1974–76)
 Fernando Riera (1977)
 Caupolicán Peña (1977–80)
 Gustavo Cortés (1980)
 Mario Tuane (1980–81)
 Gustavo Cortés (1981–83)
 Sacha Mitzjaew (1984)
 Elson Beiruth (1984)
 Gustavo Cortés (1984–85)
 Victor Manuel Castañeda (1986)
 Orlando Aravena (1986–87)
 Victor Manuel Castañeda (1988)
 Luis Ibarra (1988)
 Eugenio Jara (1988–89)
 Orlando Aravena (1989)
 Victor Manuel Castañeda (1989)
 Guillermo Duarte (1990)
 Manuel Pellegrini (1990)
 Jorge Zelada (1991)
 Manuel Pellegrini (1991–92)
 Fernando Cavalleri (1992)
 Gustavo Cortés (1992–93)
 Ricardo Dabrowski (1993)
 José Sulantay (1994)
 Elías Figueroa (1994–95)
 Germán Cornejo (1995–96)
 Orlando Aravena (1996)
 Jorge Aravena (1996–97)
 Manuel Pellegrini (1998)
 Juan Carlos Carotti (1998)
 Ricardo Dabrowski (1998–01)
 Fernando Carvallo (2002)
 Daniel Salvador (2003)
 Nicola Hadwa (2004)
 Ricardo Toro (interim) (2004)
 Horacio Rivas (2004–05)
 Fernando Carvallo (2005)
 Daniel Salvador (2006)
 Jaime Pizarro (2006–07)
 Jorge Aravena (2007)
 Luis Musrri (2007–09)
 Jorge Aravena (2009–10)
 Jaime Escobar (interim) (2010)
 Gustavo Benítez (2010–11)
 José Daniel Carreño (2012)
 Emiliano Astorga (2012–14)
 Jaime Escobar (interim) (2014)
 Pablo Guede (2014–16)
 Nicolas Cordova (2016–2017)
 Omar Toloza (interim) (2017)
 German Cavalieri (2017–18)
 Sebastian Mendez (2018)
 Ivo Basay (2018–)

Women's team
The Palestino women's team plays in the Campeonato Nacional Primera División de Fútbol Femenino, the top women's football competition in Chile. In 2015 they won the Clausura tournament, thus ending a ten-season title streak by Colo-Colo. The captain, Ashraf Khatib, lifted the title. She was quoted as saying it was a pleasure to be the first actual Palestinian woman to lift the title in Chile.

Former Palestino forward María José Urrutia was a member of the Chile women's national football team for the 2019 FIFA Women's World Cup. With a header against Thailand in Chile's 2–0 win in the group stage, she became the first Chilean player to score a goal in the FIFA Women's World Cup. Former Palestino defender Javiera Toro was also a member of the Chilean team at the 2019 tournament.

See also
 Palestinian community in Chile

References

External links
Official website 

 
Diaspora sports clubs
Football clubs in Chile
Association football clubs established in 1920
Club Deportivo Palestino
Club Deportivo Palestino